Tamara Dronova (née Balabolina; born 13 August 1993) is a Russian track and road racing cyclist, who currently rides for UCI Women's Continental Team  in road racing, and UCI Track Team Marathon–Tula in track cycling. After winning several medals as a junior and under-23 at the European Track Championships she won as an elite rider the bronze medal in the team pursuit at the 2014 UEC European Track Championships. Besides track cycling she also rides on the road and competed in 2013 at the Russian National Road Race Championships and Russian National Time Trial Championships.

As of 31 October 2014 she is still the current Russian national track cycling record holder in the 4000 m team pursuit in a time of 4:29.842 ridden at the 2013–14 UCI Track Cycling World Cup race in Aguascalientes on 5 December 2013 together with Anastasia Chulkova, Alexandra Chekina and Galina Strelsova.

Major results

Track

2011
 UEC European Junior Track Championships
1st  Team sprint (with Anastasia Voynova)
3rd  Sprint
2012
 1st  Omnium, UEC European Under-23 Track Championships
 3rd  Omnium, UEC European Track Championships
 3rd  Omnium, 2012–13 UCI Track Cycling World Cup, Glasgow
2013
 National Track Championships
1st  Team pursuit (with Alexandra Chekina, Aleksandra Goncharova and Maria Mishina)
2nd Omnium
2014
 European Under-23 Track Championships
1st  Omnium
1st  Scratch
1st  Team pursuit (with Alexandra Chekina, Aleksandra Goncharova and Gulnaz Badykova)
 2nd  Team pursuit, UEC European Track Championships (with Alexandra Chekina, Irina Molicheva, Aleksandra Goncharova and Evgenia Romanyuta)
2015
 Memorial of Alexander Lesnikov
1st Omnium
1st Scratch
 6 giorni delle rose – Fiorenzuola
1st Omnium
2nd Scratch
 2nd  Team pursuit, UEC European Track Championships (with Gulnaz Badykova, Alexandra Chekina and Maria Savitskaya)
 UEC European Under-23 Track Championships
2nd  Omnium
3rd  Team pursuit (with Gulnaz Badykova, Alexandra Chekina and Natalia Mozharova)
2016
 2nd Points race, Memorial of Alexander Lesnikov
2017
 3rd Madison, Grand Prix Minsk (with Gulnaz Badykova)
 3rd Madison, Grand Prix of Moscow (with Gulnaz Badykova)
2019
 3rd  Individual pursuit, European Games
2021
 National Track Championships
1st  Individual pursuit
2nd Madison (with Diana Klimova)
2nd Team pursuit

Road
Source: 

2015
 3rd Time trial, National Road Championships
2020
 1st Grand Prix Central Anatolia
 3rd Time trial, National Road Championships
 5th Grand Prix Mount Erciyes
 6th Grand Prix Gazipaşa
 7th Grand Prix Cappadocia
2021
 National Road Championships
1st  Time trial
3rd Road race
 4th Grand Prix Velo Manavgat
 5th Grand Prix Velo Erciyes
 8th Grand Prix Develi
2022
 National Road Championships
1st  Time trial
1st  Road race
1st Mixed team relay
 4th Overall Tour of Scandinavia
 6th Postnord Vårgårda WestSweden RR
 7th GP de Plouay
 8th Gent–Wevelgem

References

External links

1993 births
Living people
Russian track cyclists
Cyclists from Moscow
Russian female cyclists
Cyclists at the 2019 European Games
European Games medalists in cycling
European Games bronze medalists for Russia
Olympic cyclists of Russia
Cyclists at the 2020 Summer Olympics
20th-century Russian women
21st-century Russian women